The 15th People's Choice Awards, honoring the best in popular culture for 1988, were held in 1989. They were broadcast on CBS.

Winners

FAVORITE ACTRESS IN A DRAMATIC MOTION PICTURE
Meryl Streep

FAVORITE ALL-AROUND FEMALE STAR
Cher

FAVORITE MALE MUSICAL PERFORMER
Randy Travis

FAVORITE FEMALE MUSICAL PERFORMER
Whitney Houston

FAVORITE MUSIC VIDEO
"Smooth Criminal"

FAVORITE FEMALE PERFORMER IN A NEW TV SERIES
Roseanne Barr

FAVORITE NEW TV COMEDY PROGRAM
Roseanne

FAVORITE TV MINI-SERIES
War and Remembrance

FAVORITE FAVORITE MOTION PICTURE
Gone With The Wind

FAVORITE ACTOR IN A COMEDY MOTION PICTURE
Eddie Murphy

FAVORITE ACTOR IN A DRAMATIC MOTION PICTURE
Dustin Hoffman

FAVORITE FEMALE TV PERFORMER
Phylicia Rashad

FAVORITE MALE PERFORMER IN A NEW TV SERIES
John Goodman

FAVORITE NEW TV DRAMATIC PROGRAM
China Beach

FAVORITE ALL-AROUND MALE STAR
Bill Cosby

FAVORITE ACTRESS IN A COMEDY MOTION PICTURE
Bette Midler

FAVORITE MALE TV PERFORMER
Bill Cosby

FAVORITE TV COMEDY PROGRAM
The Cosby Show

FAVORITE TV DRAMATIC PROGRAM
L.A. Law

FAVORITE YOUNG TV PERFORMER
Kirk Cameron

FAVORITE FAVORITE TV PROGRAM
The Cosby Show

FAVORITE COMEDY MOTION PICTURE
Big,
Twins (tie)

FAVORITE DRAMATIC MOTION PICTURE
Rain Man

References

People's Choice Awards
1988 awards in the United States
1989 in American television
August 1989 events in the United States